Matthieu Androdias (born 11 June 1990) is a French representative rower. He is a three time Olympian, an Olympic champion and a dual world champion. 

He competed in the men's quadruple sculls at the 2012 Summer Olympics and in the men's double scull at the 2016 Summer Olympics.  Rowing with Hugo Boucheron he won the double sculls event at the 2018 World Championships in Plovdiv having earlier that year won the European title together.  The duo had also previously come second at the 2015 European Championships. Still partnered with Boucheron in 2021, he won the Olympic gold medal in the double scull at Tokyo 2020.

References

External links
 

1990 births
Living people
French male rowers
Olympic rowers of France
Rowers at the 2012 Summer Olympics
Rowers at the 2016 Summer Olympics
Rowers at the 2020 Summer Olympics
Sportspeople from La Rochelle
World Rowing Championships medalists for France
European Rowing Championships medalists
Medalists at the 2020 Summer Olympics
Olympic medalists in rowing
Olympic gold medalists for France
21st-century French people